Cal Lee (born October 20, 1946) is an American football coach who is currently the defensive coordinator at Saint Louis School in Honolulu. A former assistant head coach for the University of Hawaii football team, Lee was a successful high school football coach prior to joining the staff at the University of Hawaii in 2003.

High school coaching career
Known as one of the nation's most successful high school coaches, Lee led the St. Louis Crusaders to 14 Prep Bowl titles, 18 Interscholastic League of Honolulu championships, and the inaugural HHSAA State Championship in 1999. In his 21 seasons with the Crusaders, Lee compiled a 241–32–5 record. During his tenure as head coach at Saint Louis, Lee was instrumental in introducing the run and shoot offense to the state of Hawaii.

Lee's success at Saint Louis also includes a 55-game win streak that spanned over six seasons (1985–1990) and a 15–1–1 record against out-of-state teams. The two-time national coach of the year is the most prolific coach in the history of Hawaii prep football. Lee's success as a coach trickled down to his players as well. He coached numerous players who went on to play at the NCAA Division I, including all-time NCAA passing leader Timmy Chang and Olin Kreutz, Dominic Raiola, Chris Fuamatu-Maʻafala, who each went on to play professionally in the National Football League (NFL). He resigned the head coaching position to become athletic director for the school in 2002, and left the school in 2003 to coach the Hawaii Islanders arena football team.

Before becoming the head coach at Saint Louis, Lee served as the defense coordinator for Kaiser High School from 1973 to 1979. In 1979, Kaiser won the Prep Bowl, which was the mythical state championship for Hawaii.

In January 2012, Lee was named the new defensive coordinator at Kalani High School. Lee's brother, Ron, is the current offensive coordinator of the Falcons.

Lee was once again named the head coach at Saint Louis in 2014, taking over a Crusaders team that had suffered two losing seasons. He stepped down from his head coaching position at Saint Louis in 2020 with his brother Ron succeeding him as head coach, but would remain with the program as defensive coordinator.

Arena Football 2 coaching career
In 2003, Lee accepted the job as head coach of Hawaii's first arena football team, the Hawaiian Islanders of the af2. The Islanders secured a playoff berth and posted a 12–6 record in his first season. Lee would coach the team again in 2004 before the team eventually disbanded in the offseason.

College coaching career
Before becoming the linebackers coach for the University of Hawaii in 2003, Lee had previously been an assistant coach for his alma mater, Willamette University, where he had garnered All-American honors as a linebacker. Lee was the offensive line coach at Willamette during 1970. He returned in 1978 as the linebacker coach before heading back to Hawaii to coach prep football.  In 2008, he became University of Hawaii's defensive coordinator.

Lee again coached alongside his brother Ron, who served as the offensive coordinator and wide receiver coach for the University of Hawaii under Greg McMackin until his retirement in 2011.

References

1946 births
Living people
American football linebackers
af2 coaches
Hawaii Rainbow Warriors football coaches
Willamette Bearcats football players
High school football coaches in Hawaii
Sportspeople from Hawaii